Oze is a commune in the Hautes-Alpes department in southeastern France.

Population

See also
Communes of the Hautes-Alpes department

External links 
 Site de la mairie

References

Communes of Hautes-Alpes
Dauphiné